Hamid Ali is a Maldivian film director, producer, actor and writer.

Career
In 1993, Ali starred in two films; Mithutu and Vari. The following year, he starred alongside Hassan Afeef, Arifa Ibrahim, Lillian Saeed and Mariyam Haajara in Ibrahim Rasheed's family drama Dhevana An'bi, in which he played a negative character, Amjad who separates a happy couple for enmity. The film revolves around a couple who gets separated due to social discrimination initiated by a cunning mother-in-law. In 1995, he wrote and starred in Mohamed Shiyaz's film Dhushman alongside Mariyam Nisha and Hussain Sobah. The following year, Ali released his drama film, Badhal, in which he starred alongside Hussain Sobah and Niuma Mohamed as a wealthy and pride businessman who is being duped in a series of events caused due to a misunderstanding by a "non-existent" twin.

Ali appeared alongside Hussain Sobah, Mariyam Nisha and Jamsheedha Ahmed as a producer and Romeo who is ready to go extreme extent to win his love in Amjad Ibrahim's Loabeega Aniyaa (1997). This was followed by his role a supportive friend in his film, Dhefirin opposite Hassan Afeef, Jamsheedha Ahmed and Asad Shareef. It marks the first Maldivian film that has been primarily shot in Sri Lanka. The following year, he directed, produced and wrote the film Mila Handhuvaru (1998) co-starring Mariyam Nisha and Mohamed Hassan which received mixed reviews from critics.

Yoosuf Shafeeu directed horror film Edhathuru was released in 2004 which appears Mohamed Shavin, Sheeren Abdul Wahid, Ali Ahmed, Lufshan Shakeeb, Fathmath Neelam, Nadhiya Hassan, Ibrahim Sobah and Yoosuf Solih as eight friends who go on a picnic to a haunted uninhabited island and their battle for survival. The film garnered critical appreciation specially for its sound effect and was a commercial success.

In 2008, Ali appeared in a small role in Fathimath Nahula's romantic drama film, Yoosuf which depicts the story of a deaf and mute man (played by Yoosuf Shafeeu) who has been mistreated by a wealthy family, mocking his disability. Featuring an ensemble cast including Yoosuf Shafeeu, Niuma Mohamed, Sheela Najeeb, Ahmed Nimal, Fauziyya Hassan, Ravee Farooq, Zeenath Abbas and Ahmed Lais Asim, the film received widespread critical acclaim and was attained a blockbuster status at box office.

In 2009, Hamid was cast as a hardworking father who experiences some unexplained supernatural activities in Amjad Ibrahim's romantic horror film Udhabaani featured alongside Yoosuf Shafeeu, Amira Ismail and Aminath Shareef. Upon release, the film received mixed reviews from critics thought it performed well at box office, making it Ibrahim's most successful venture.

In 2010, Ali starred in Abdul Fahtah's horror film Jinni alongside Ali Seezan and Mariyam Afeefa. Based on true incidents that occurred in an island of Maldives, he played the role of a spell-maker. Prior to release the film was marketed to be full of "suspense and uniqueness" compared to other mediocre Maldivian horror films. Upon release, the film received mixed reviews from critics; majority of them complaining for having the "same old feeling" of prior horror flicks though the performance were noted to be satisfactory. Despite the mixed reviews, the film witnessed a positive response at the box office, screening a total of twenty two housefull shows in Male', declaring it as a Mega-Hit.

Ali released his sixth direction, a family drama Laelaa produced and written by Ali and starring Yoosuf Shafeeu and Amira Ismail in lead roles. The film revolves around two daughters who were forced to arranged marriage by their parent. His screenplay and direction received negative response from critics; "Laela is too slow and dragged, some scenes get too lengthy leaving the audience yawning at boredom. The story is predictable and lacks reality". The film was declared a flop at box office.

Filmography

Feature film

Television

Short film

References 

Living people
People from Malé
21st-century Maldivian male actors
Maldivian male film actors
Maldivian film directors
Year of birth missing (living people)